Guy Morgan may refer to:
 Guy Morgan (basketball) (born 1960), retired American basketball player
 Guy Morgan (writer) (1908–1964), British screenwriter
 Guy Morgan (rugby union) (1907–1973), Welsh rugby union player and cricketer